is a Japanese performing artist and a former member of the Takarazuka Revue, where she specialized in playing male characters (Otokoyaku). She joined the revue in 1990 and resigned in 2005. She is from Osaka.

Troupe history
 Moon Troupe: 1990–1998
 Cosmo Troupe: 1998–2000
 Supreme Member: 2000–2005

General information
Considered as one of the powerful and multi-talented actresses while she was in the rooster, she started her Takarazuka career at Moon Troupe. Even though never being cast as the top bill during her new actor era, she already showed her talent since then—the most memorable is Jaqueline Carstone in the first act of Me and My Girl. In her latter day in Moon Troupe, she once again portrayed in a female role: Anita from the Moon's production of West Side Story. Also, she could be in tough role like Ricardo in The Wind of Buenos Aires and a small-time crook like Duchain in Crossroad.

In 1998, she was being transferred to the newly found Cosmos Troupe in order to replace Hikaru Asami, who had been transferred to Snow Troupe, and her first role in Cosmo Troupe is Prince Rudolph in the Tokyo run of Cosmo's production of Elisabeth in 1998. With the future portray of Emperor Franz Joseph of Flower's production of Elisabeth in 2003, she became one of the three actresses that has portrayed both father and son in this musical (along with Yōka Wao, who is the Emperor in the 1998 production and Mao Ayabuki, who is the Prince in the 2003 production) among actresses from the company.

In June 2000, the directors of the company had made a radical change on the troupe structure by sending the second and third tier actresses of each troupe to the Senka, which served as the waiting list for top star of the troupes. Under this circumstance, she became one of the "Senka's Eleven" along with Wataru Kozuki. Therefore, when she had her first Bow Hall leading show, Freedom: Mr. Carmen (the retelling of the famous opera Carmen with Carmen is male and Jose [reversed with Josie] is female), which is under the production of Cosmo Troupe, she is billed as a member of Senka rather than as a member of Cosmo Troupe.

She made special appearance in the production of Flower, Snow, Star and Cosmo. Also, she hosted TV show for Takarazuka Sky Stage, the speciality channel of TCA. In 2005, she resigned from the Revue via Flower Troupe by having her top bill performance Ernest in Love, reunioned with Asuka Tono. This makes her the only one among the Eleven (that did not make to the top) to have her own top bill show while resigning from the company.

After the resignation from the company, she continues her career on stage. Currently, she is married and hosts JURI no dondake GOGO5!? for Takarauzuka Sky Stage as a part of the celebration of fifth anniversary of the channel.

She got married on March 3, 2007.

She is one of the cast in the first production of the Japanese stage version of The Wedding Singer

Notable Performance and Roles

Takarazuka Era

Moon New Actor Era

Me and My Girl – Jaqueline Carstone (Act 1)
Can-Can – Boris
Descendant of Baron – Richard

Moon Era

West Side Story – Anita
The Wind of Buenos Aires – Ricardo (Starring Jun Shibuki)
Dark Brown Eyes – Sergeant Maximich

Cosmos Era

Elisabeth –  Rudolph (Replacing Hikaru Asami for Tokyo performance)
Crossroad – Duchain
Passion: Jose and Carmen – Remendad
Black Rose of the Desert – Shayza

Senka Era

With Flower Troupe

Michelangelo – Mendolini
Elisabeth – Franz Joseph
Marrakech: A Crimson Tombstone – Leon (Last performance at the Grand Theater)
Ernest in Love – Jack Worthing (Last performance with Takarazuka)

With Snow Troupe

Romance de Paris – Rachid Salam

With Star Troupe

Rose of Versailles – Andre (Sharing with Tatsuki Kouju and Wataru Kozuki in the Takarazuka run)

With Cosmos Troupe

Freedom: Mr. Carmen – Carmen (Bow Hall lead performance)
Nostalgia Across the Sea – Genkuro Tokaiya
Castel Mirage – Richard Taylor (Replacing Wataru Kozuki in the Tokyo performance)
Phantom – Gerard Carriere

Personal Concert

JUBILEE-S

Performance outside Takarazuka

Cinderella, Prince (with Asuka Tono and former members of TCA)
SHOCK

Performance after Takarazuka

Berlin to Broadway with Kurt Weill
Christmas Fantasy (Christmans DS)
Gelvestar Gala Concert
Elisabeth 10th Anniversary Gala Concert – Luigi Lucheni
Juri Sakiho LIVE SHOW　I gotta JURI'SM!
TANGO SUMMER FASHION
Secret Bridesmaid's Business
Sweet Charity
Side Show as Daisy Hilton
SUPER COLLABORATE SHOW "Mr. PINSTRIPE"
MUSICAL GALA CONCERT Vol.2 
In the Heights as Camila Rosario
Thoroughly Modern Millie
The Wedding Singer
Legally Blonde as Paulette Buonufonte (2017–2019)
Les Misérables as Madame Thenardier (2021–Present)

References

External links
 Official Page (in Japanese)

Japanese actresses
Living people
People from Minoh, Osaka
Takarazuka Revue
1971 births